Massimiliano Benucci (born 10 November 1998) is an Italian football player. He plays as a midfielder.

Club career

Arezzo 
On 4 October 2017, Benucci made his professional debut, in Serie C, for Arezzo, as a substitute replacing Curtis Yebili in the 87th minute of a 2–1 home win over Pontedera. On 23 December, Benucci played his first match as a starter for Arezzo, a 2–1 away defeat against Arzachena, he was replaced by Eugenio D'Ursi in the 54th minute. On 30 December he scored his first professional goal, as a substitute, in the 84th minute of a 4–2 home win over Giana Erminio. On 10 April 2018 he played his first entire match for Arezzo, a 3–2 away win over Olbia.

Empoli
On 12 July 2018, he signed with Serie A club Empoli who immediately loaned him back to Arezzo for the 2018–19 season.

Arezzo
On 21 August 2019, he returned to Arezzo on a permanent basis.

Career statistics

Club

References

External links 
 

1998 births
Sportspeople from the Province of Arezzo
Footballers from Tuscany
Living people
Italian footballers
Association football midfielders
S.S. Arezzo players
Serie C players